The ashy-headed greenlet (Hylophilus pectoralis) is a species of bird in the family Vireonidae.
It is found in Bolivia, Brazil, French Guiana, Guyana, Peru, Suriname, and Venezuela.
Its natural habitats are subtropical or tropical dry forests, subtropical or tropical moist lowland forests, subtropical or tropical mangrove forests, and heavily degraded former forest.

References

ashy-headed greenlet
Birds of Brazil
Birds of the Guianas
ashy-headed greenlet
ashy-headed greenlet
Birds of the Amazon Basin
Taxonomy articles created by Polbot